In mathematics, a nonstandard integer may refer to

Hyperinteger, the integer part of a hyperreal number
an integer in a non-standard model of arithmetic